Selfiee is a 2023 Indian Hindi language comedy-drama film directed by Raj Mehta and produced by Dharma Productions, Magic Frames, Prithviraj Productions, Cape of Good Films with Star Studios as distributor. The film stars Akshay Kumar and Emraan Hashmi in lead roles while Diana Penty and Nushrratt Bharuccha play supporting roles. A remake of the 2019 Malayalam film, Driving Licence, the film revolves around a rivalry between an RTO Inspector and a prominent actor. 

Filming commenced in March 2022. It was theatrically released on 24 February 2023. The film received mixed to positive reviews from critics alike. However, the film was a huge commercial failure, earning only ₹23.63 crore at the box office.Selfiee just gathered 40 Lakhs ahead of time booking selling just 8200 tickets in the public multiplexes despite the fact that advance opened late on Wednesday.

Plot 
Om Prakash Aggarwal, a Motor Vehicle Inspector (MVI) based in Bhopal, is a passionate fan of film actor Vijay Kumar. Vijay is preparing to leave for the United States for his wife Naina's diagnosis, delaying the filming of his next film, which already incurred a budget overrun. With the climax still remaining to be shot at an Indian Navy leased land, the crew learns that Vijay's driving licence, that needs to be submitted to get clearance, is missing. The producer is outraged as the film has to be wrapped as soon as possible. Due to a clerical error while shifting between RTO buildings, Vijay cannot apply for a duplicate licence as issuing a new licence would take time. Hence, Vijay's politician friend meets Om for speeding the procedure. Om agrees to issue licence illicitly without Vijay even attending the test. In return, he summons Vijay to the RTO to meet him in person and as proof in case of an inquiry. 

Meanwhile, Vijay's professional rival Suraj Diwan is plotting to suppress competition from Vijay by means of occult. Even though he realises going to the RTO might give away clues for his visit, Vijay hesitatingly agrees, hoping that an unadvertised visit calls for less visibility. On his arrival, he sees TV channels surrounding the premises, amidst Vijay's peon Vimla gives a misinformation to a reporter that Vijay, an avid driver has been driving without a licence. The news spreads, and an infuriated Vijay scolds Om in front of his son and superiors for the leak and leaves. Angered, Om informs the reporters that Vijay was arrogant and wanted a licence without going through the normal procedures. Vijay's reputation has been severely damaged and to worsen the situation, Suraj's fans community head organises a hit-and-run attack on Om. He also has masked gang cast stones at his house and Om's son suffers a head injury, which makes Om to believe that Vijay 's  men were behind this. 

Meanwhile, Vijay reluctantly cancels his US trip on the producer's insistence. While rushing his son to the hospital, a frustrated Vijay calls Om by phone and threatens him, which affirms Om's conviction. On police inquiry, Om and his wife Minty accuse Vijay, but Vijay is not charged as his involvement was inconclusive. Protesting it, Om and his family perform Satyagraha in front of Vijay's residence, where media and fans also assemble. Addressing media, Vijay states that Om is a crazy fan and a kind of stalker who finds gratification by being a part in his idol's life through disruption. He shows Om's fan messages as evidence and announces that he has decided to attend the test in the supervision of Om. Vijay gets permission for an open test, which can be viewed by media and can be telecast live, the computer-based test is replaced with a direct question-answer session with Om. Om asks difficult and unusual questions, still Vijay manages to pass the learner's test. 

Om's son is bullied by Vijay's fan-boys in school. With that, Om decides not to send him to school until Vijay has failed and is determined to fail him using maximum discretion. Meanwhile, Naina requires a surgery, and a flight is charted to reach there as soon as the test is completed. On the practical assessment day, Vijay smoothly completes the "H test", but Om fails him pointing petty mistakes. The decision is overruled by his superior and passes Vijay. Om makes Vijay wait until noon for the follow up "road test". At noon, he postpones the test by two days, which happens to be the day of Naina's surgery. Vijay announces to the onlooking fans and media that he is forfeiting driving forever because Om has totally misused his power and he will retire from acting if this disrupts his life further. Enraged, the fans begin lynching Om, but Vijay saves him and flees from the place.

While en route, they clear the misunderstandings. Om reveals that Vijay's licence was in the gift box which was thrown earlier by Vijay in RTO office. Vijay brings Om and his family to his house, where he scolds Suraj and Vimla for their mistakes. Two days later, before leaving to the airport Vijay interacts with the press about their reconciliation and tells that he has received his driving licence. Vijay then drives off in his car to the airport.

Cast 
 Akshay Kumar as Vijay Kumar 
 Emraan Hashmi as RTO Inspector Om Prakash Aggarwal
 Diana Penty as Naina, Vijay's wife
 Nushrratt Bharuccha as Minty Aggarwal, Om's wife 
 Mahesh Thakur as Naveen
 Meghna Malik as Vimla Tiwari
 Abhimanyu Singh as Suraj Diwan
 Adah Sharma as Meera 
 Kusha Kapila as Tara 
 Mrunal Thakur as dancer in song "Kudiyee Ni Teri" (special appearance)
 Yo Yo Honey Singh as himself in song "Kudiyee Ni Teri" (special appearance)
 Jacqueline Fernandez as dancer in song "Deewane" (special appearance)

Production 
The film was announced in January 2022 (see below) with a motion poster by Dharma Productions. Principal photography commenced in March 2022 in Mumbai and wrapped up in December 2022.

Music
The music of the film is composed by Anu Malik, Tanishk Bagchi, Yo Yo Honey Singh, The PropheC, Lijo George-DJ Chetas, Vikram Montrose, Aditya Yadav and Tarun. The first song, "Main Khiladi" was released on 1 February 2023. It is the remixed version of the title song from the 1994 blockbuster, Main Khiladi Tu Anari. The second single titled "Kudiyee Ni Teri" was released on 9 February 2023. The third single titled "Kudi Chamkeeli" was released on 19 February 2023.

Release 
The film was officially announced on 12 January 2022. The film's official trailer was released on 22 January 2023.

An Instagram reel featuring Akshay Kumar and Salman Khan dancing together on the film's song "Main Khiladi" went viral and became the most viewed and most liked reel by an Indian celebrity on Instagram. At a promotional event for the film, Akshay Kumar clicked 184 selfies with fans in three minutes, breaking the Guiness World Record for the most number of selfies clicked in three minutes.

Theatrical
The film released on 24 February 2023.

Reception

Critical response
The Times of India gave the film 3.5 out of 5 stars and wrote "Overall, Selfiee is an easy-breezy watch, with some good performances and several laugh-out-loud moments. If you're looking for a rib-tickling comedy over the weekend, this one could be a good pick." Bollywood Hungama gave 3 out of 5 stars and wrote " SELFIEE works due to the plot, direction, dialogues and faceoff between the actors. At the box office, the film will have to rely on strong word of mouth and spot bookings to make a mark."

Zinia Bandyopadhyay of India Today gave 3 out of 5 stars and wrote "Akshay Kumar-Emraan Hashmi roll out a good remake that’s genuinely fun". Monika Rawal Kukreja of Hindustan Times  wrote "Akshay Kumar gets up, close and personal with his superstardom in this mass entertainer". Anna MM Vetticad of Firstpost gave 2.25 out of 5 stars and wrote "A reasonably entertaining Akshay Kumar starrer after a long time".

Box office
The film collected  India net on its opening day becoming one of the lowest openings of Akshay Kumar.

References

External links 
 
  at Bollywood Hungama
 

2020s Hindi-language films
2023 films
2023 comedy-drama films
Indian comedy-drama films
Star Studios films
Disney India films
Films about actors
Hindi remakes of Malayalam films